Nellie is an oyster sloop located at Mystic Seaport in Mystic, Connecticut, United States. Nellie was built in 1891 in Smithtown, New York and was used for oyster dredging in Long Island Sound. Mystic Seaport acquired her in 1964 to add to their collection of watercraft.

Images
Nellie, a Long Island Oyster Sloop, The Book of Wooden Boats, Vol. 1

References

Tourist attractions in New London County, Connecticut
Oyster sloops
Museum ships in Mystic, Connecticut
1891 ships
Individual sailing vessels
Ships built in New York (state)